This is a list of listed buildings in the United Kingdom.

The organization of the lists in this series is on the same basis as the statutory registers, which generally rely on counties. For England and Wales, the county names are broadly those of the ceremonial counties of England and Wales and do not always match the current administrative areas, whereas in most cases they parallel the current subdivisions of Scotland. In Northern Ireland the province's six traditional counties are used, and these are unchanged in modern times.

Different classifications of listed buildings are used in different parts of the United Kingdom:

England and Wales: Grade I, Grade II* and Grade II; 
Scotland: Category A, Category B and Category C
Northern Ireland: Grade A, Grade B+, Grade B1 and Grade B2

Listed buildings in the United Kingdom

The lists for the countries of the UK are at:

Listed buildings in England
Listed buildings in Scotland
Listed buildings in Northern Ireland
Listed buildings in Wales

See also
Scheduled monument
Listed buildings in the Falkland Islands

References

External links
 Full list.  Many of the entries are private houses or village churches which are unlikely to have a Wikipedia page of their own.